On 20 April 2015, a 13-year-old, Max Porta carried out an attack at his high school, IES Joan Fuster, in Barcelona, Catalonia, Spain, killing one teacher and injuring four others.

Porta was armed with a crossbow and a machete, On arrival to school, he started shooting in a class with the crossbow, resulting in a teacher being killed and four students injured.

The attack was the first documented case of a student killing a teacher in Spain.

Attack
Porta began the attack by arriving late to class, and firing a crossbow into the face of a female teacher. The student then fatally stabbed another teacher, Abel Martínez Oliva, as Martínez came to help the female teacher, trying to get her out.

Two other students were injured in the attack, including the daughter of the female teacher.

The attack ended when the school P.E. teacher, David Jurado Fernández, managed to talk the student down. According to Jurado, he found the student in the second floor classroom with a knife, a crossbow, a backpack, and manipulating a beer bottle to make a molotov cocktail. Jurado then told the student that he was hurting more people than he realized and asked him to show him what he had in his backpack. The student did, then collapsed in tears into Jurado's arms. 

Jurado then sat with the student in the classroom until the police arrived.

Victims
One teacher was killed in the attack, and four others were injured.

The teacher killed was a substitute teacher who had only recently begun working at the school. Two additional teachers and two students were also injured in the attacks. None of the injured victims were reported to have been seriously injured.

Perpetrator
The perpetrator was identified as Max Porta, 13-year-old student also known as the suspected attacker of this school.

After the attack, the suspect's classmates and close friends said that he "was a withdrawn boy who had academic problems". They, along with most other people, were aware of a "blacklist" which included twenty people's names who he wanted to kill. Friends argued that he had spent months talking about it, but they thought it was a "sick joke". The Minister of Education said that the boy was admitted and assessed at the Sant Joan de Déu hospital, where he was diagnosed with a psychotic breakdown.

According to Article 19 of the Criminal Code, being a minor (18 years in Spain) "will not be criminally responsible," however, says that in case of committing a crime, he could be liable as appropriate to the law of the minor. However, since he was under 14, the young man was exempt from responsibility.

References

2015 in Spain
2010s crimes in Spain
2010s in Barcelona
April 2015 crimes in Europe
April 2015 events in Spain
Attacks in Europe in 2015
Crime in Barcelona
High school killings in Europe